William Henry Hill (15 March 1920 – 1999) was an English professional footballer who played in the Football League for Mansfield Town.

References

1920 births
1999 deaths
English footballers
Association football inside forwards
English Football League players
Chesterfield F.C. players
Mansfield Town F.C. players